Lothar Huber (born 5 May 1952 in Kaiserslautern) is a German football coach and a former player.

Career 
As a player, he spent 17 seasons in the Bundesliga:  4 with 1. FC Kaiserslautern and 13 with Borussia Dortmund.

Coaching career
After his assistant coaching job with Borussia Dortmund, he was named as the new manager of TSG Sprockhövel where he discovered the talent Lukas Schmitz. After three years with TSG Sprockhövel, Huber resigned and began to work as manager of SpVgg Radevormwald, before he returned to his former club TSG Sprockhövel in August 2008.

Honours
 DFB-Pokal finalist: 1971–72

References

External links
 

1952 births
Living people
German footballers
1. FC Kaiserslautern players
Borussia Dortmund players
Bundesliga players
2. Bundesliga players
German football managers
Borussia Dortmund II managers
Association football defenders